The Australian Auto-Sport Alliance (AASA) is an organisation that promotes and administers motorsport in Australia founded in 2003. The AASA formed due to dissatisfaction with the governing body of Australian motorsport, the Confederation of Australian Motor Sport (CAMS, now Motorsport Australia), and organises race meetings independent of Motorsport Australia.  A wholly owned subsidiary of the Benalla Auto Club, who also own Winton Motor Raceway and Wakefield Park, the association sanctions motor sport in various categories.

History
The AASA was founded in 2003.

In 2016, the AASA sanctioned a round of the Australian Formula Ford Series at Winton, the first time they had sanctioned an established national championship event. This caused controversy however, as CAMS (now Motorsport Australia) official Paul Zsidy competed at this event, in breach of the CAMS constitution. CAMS issued a fine to Zsidy, while AASA chairman Bruce Robertson called for CAMS to reverse this decision. CAMS declined, however, reiterating that members in a governance role are not permitted to compete in events not recognised by CAMS or the FIA.

Further controversy between the AASA and CAMS occurred in 2017 when Grant Denyer and co-driver Dale Moscatt were airlifted to hospital after Denyer crashed during the Lake Mountain Sprint, a round of the AASA sanctioned Australian Tarmac Rally Championship. CAMS expressed concerns about the safety of the event, encouraging a police investigation into the accident, to which AASA chairman Robertson responded that they had sufficient safety and risk management protocols.

In 2018, the AASA sanctioned Australian Motor Racing Series (AMRS) was launched as a competitor to the CAMS sanctioned Shannons Nationals Motor Racing Championships.

Classes
The AASA includes all categories of race cars from sedans, to open wheelers. The Benalla Auto Club promotes the AMRS and uses AASA sanctioning for the series.

Motorcycles
In 2007 the AASA started to promote motorcycle road racing as well as car racing in Queensland. On 28–29 April a meeting took place at Queensland Raceway for cars and motorcycles.

In 2016 the AASA exited motorcycle licensing and sanctioning—forming an alliance with Motorcycling Australia, who took over sanctioning of motorcycle racing events at Winton and Wakefield Park.  These changes allowed AASA to concentrate on four-wheeled motoring activities.

References

External links
 AASA
 AMRS

Motorsport governing bodies in Australia
2003 establishments in Australia